Tander may refer to:

People
 Garth Tander (born 1977), Australian racing driver
 Leanne Tander (born 1980), Australian racing driver, wife of Garth
 Mina Tander (born 1978), German actress
 Simin Tander (born 1980), German singer

Other uses
 Tander, the parent company of Magnit, Russia's largest food retailer.